Annie Le Porte Diggs (Le Porte; February 22, 1853 – September 7, 1916) was a Canadian-born American activist, journalist, author, and librarian. She was the chairman of the delegation from Washington, D.C. for the National People's Party Convention, in Omaha, in 1892. It was the first time a woman ever led a delegation at a national political convention. She was a speaker for the People's Party in nearly every state and territory. She served as state librarian of Kansas, 1898–1902. A writer, Diggs served as the associate editor of The Advocate, Topeka, Kansas, and was the author of Little Brown Brothers and the Story of Jerry Simpson. Diggs died in 1916 in Michigan.

Early life and education
Annie Le Porte was born in London, Ontario, Canada, February 22, 1853 (February 22, 1848 is also mentioned), the daughter of Cornelius, a lawyer, and Ann Maria (Thomas) Le Porte. Her ancestry can be traced in a direct line to General John Stark, of the American Revolutionary War.

In 1855, the family removed to New Jersey where Diggs studied with a governess, and also received education at a convent and public schools.

Career

On September 21, 1873, after finishing school and moving to Kansas she married Alvin S. Diggs, a postal clerk of Lawrence, Kansas. She then began her career in public as a journalist, publishing the Kansas Liberal with her husband from their home in Lawrence. She entered the field to fight for political and personal independence and equality. Diggs also lectured before literary, reformatory and religious assemblages. She lectured on sociology.

When the Farmers' Alliance movement among the western farmers began, she entered the field and soon found herself at the front among those who were engineering that industrial movement. During the political campaigns in Kansas and neighboring states, she made many speeches. She was chosen by the People's Party to reply to the platform utterances of John James Ingalls, which largely contributed to his overthrow. She was elected national secretary of the National Citizens' Industrial Alliance, at the annual meeting of that organization in St. Louis, Missouri, February 22, 1892.

In 1881, she addressed the annual convention of the Free Religious Association, in Boston, Massachusetts, on "Liberalism in the West." For years, she was a member of the Woman's Christian Temperance Union (WCTU). Much of her journalistic work was done on the Advocate, the organ of the Citizens' Alliance, on which journal she served as the leading editorial writer. She spent much time in Washington, D.C., after the upheaval caused by the Alliance, and did notable work in correspondence for the western newspapers.

Diggs served as president of multiple organizations including Woman's Alliance of the District of Columbia, the Kansas Woman's Free Silver League (1897), the Kansas Equal Suffrage Association (1899), and the Kansas Woman's Press Association. She was a delegate to the International Cooperative Congress, in Manchester. England, 1903, and the Peace congress, Rouen, France, 1904.

Personal life
Their family consisted of two daughters, Mabel and Ester, and one son, Fred. In religion, she was a radical Unitarian.

While living in Lawrence, Diggs superintended the hatching and partial raising of silk-worms fed upon the leaves of the Osage orange, which resulted in nearly 2,000,000 healthy silk-worms produced in the summer of 1883. Some were sent to Corinth, Mississippi, and others were colonized in different parts of the country. She was the author of Silk raising in Kansas: instruction book (1883).

Diggs died September 7, 1916, in Detroit, Michigan.

Selected works

  1883, Silk raising in Kansas : instruction book
  1899, Little brown brother
  1900, Stephen McLallin
  1902, Catalogue of the law books in the Kansas State library
  1908, The story of Jerry Simpson
  1912, Bedrock : education and employment, the foundation of the republic

References

Attribution

Bibliography

External links
 
 
Annie Diggs Online Collection (State Library of Kansas)

1853 births
1916 deaths
19th-century American journalists
19th-century American women writers
19th-century Canadian journalists
19th-century Canadian writers
19th-century Canadian women writers
American librarians
American women librarians
American women journalists
Pre-Confederation Canadian emigrants to the United States
Journalists from Ontario
Kansas Populists
Writers from London, Ontario
Canadian women non-fiction writers
Wikipedia articles incorporating text from A Woman of the Century
19th-century women journalists